The Women's Discus Throw event at the 1988 Summer Olympics in Seoul, South Korea had an entry list of 22 competitors, with two qualifying groups before the final (12) took place on Thursday September 29, 1988.

Medalists

Records
These were the standing World and Olympic records (in metres) prior to the 1988 Summer Olympics.

The following Olympic record was set during this competition.

Qualifying round
Held on Wednesday September 28, 1988

Final

See also
 1986 Women's European Championships Discus Throw (Stuttgart)
 1987 Women's World Championships Discus Throw (Rome)
 1990 Women's European Championships Discus Throw (Split)
 1991 Women's World Championships Discus Throw (Tokyo)

References

External links
  Official Report

D
Discus throw at the Olympics
1988 in women's athletics
Women's events at the 1988 Summer Olympics